Nanton can mean:

Places 

 Nanton, Alberta, a town in the province of Alberta, Canada
 Nanton, Saône-et-Loire, a commune in the region of Bourgogne, France
 Nanton, Northern Ghana, a town and District capital in Ghana

People 

 Philip Nanton (living), Vincentian writer, poet and spoken-word performer
 Sampson Nanton (born 1977), Trinidad and Tobago journalist
 Tricky Sam Nanton (1904–1946), American trombonist
 Ann Saunderson, born Ann Nanton, British dance/soul artist